"Dynamite" is the official fight song of Vanderbilt University, written by Vanderbilt alumni Francis Craig in 1938 a week prior to a football game between the college and the University of Tennessee.  It is played at football games, basketball games, and at other Commodore sports events.

"Dynamite" traditions
The fight song is traditionally played at the beginning of home football games when the Vanderbilt Commodores football team runs through the "V" formed by the Spirit of Gold Marching Band, when Vandy scores, Vandy forces a turnover and at the end of the game just before the playing of the Vanderbilt University alma mater.

During basketball games, the fight song is played when the team runs out onto the court, shortened versions are played during timeouts, and the whole song is played immediately after the game concludes.

Recently, students have begun using the "V-U hand signal" during the fight song while they spell "V-A-N-D-Y!" and chant the end of the cheer.

References

External links
 "Dynamite", in WAV format, performed by the Spirit of Gold
 "Dynamite", in AIFF format, performed by the Spirit of Gold
 History of the fight song, from Vanderbilt's Office of Student-Athletics
 Vanderbilt Cheerleading website for the fight song
 "Cheer for Old Vandy", the former fight song of Vanderbilt, ca. 1945-1960, in AIFF format and performed by the Spirit of Gold

Vanderbilt University
American college songs
College fight songs in the United States
Southeastern Conference fight songs
Songs written by Francis Craig
1938 songs